Horace Mann Middle School or Horace Mann Junior High School may refer to:

 Horace Mann Junior High School, Chesterfield Square, Los Angeles
 Horace Mann Middle School, San Diego, California, a secondary school in San Diego
Horace Mann Middle School (Denver, Colorado), a Denver Landmark
 Horace Mann Middle School, a Miami-Dada County public school, Florida
 Horace Mann Middle School, Brandon, Florida
 Horace Mann Middle School, a former school at the site of King Science and Technology Magnet Center, Omaha, Nebraska
 Horace Mann Junior High School, Baytown, Texas; part of the Goose Creek Consolidated Independent School District
 Horace Mann Middle School, Charleston, West Virginia
 Horace Mann Middle School, Sheboygan, Wisconsin; part of Sheboygan Area School District
 Horace Mann Middle School, Wausau, Wisconsin

See also
 Horace Mann School (disambiguation)
 Horace Mann (disambiguation)

 Mann Arts and Science Magnet Middle School, Little Rock, Arkansas; formerly known as Horace Mann Junior High School